"Wasted Light" is a song released from Irish singer/songwriter Ronan Keating's ninth solo album "Fires". The song was written by Edvard Førre Erfjord, Henrik Barman Michelsen and Gary Go. It was released as promotional single.

Critical reception
Radio Creme Brulee stated that "On the song, Keating sings from the perspective of a man reminiscing about a love that took the form of a journey. This man pines with a hint of optimism for the return of that loved one. The track opens with a sparse acoustic guitar arrangement and a light mid-tempo percussion that one can easily snap his or her fingers to. It incorporates more sonic layers as the verses progress  serving as a gradual build-up for the achingly beautiful chorus. The song paints quite a picture and despite its lyrics, has an uplifting feel with a flavor that is reminiscent of Keating’s debut single 'When You Say Nothing at All.'"

Music video
The music video for the song premiered on 28 November 2012, via YouTube. The music video part live, part animated.

Track listing

Chart performance

References

2012 songs
2012 singles
Ronan Keating songs
Polydor Records singles
Songs written by Shelly Poole
Songs written by Henrik Barman Michelsen
Songs written by Edvard Forre Erfjord